Remco van der Ven (born 24 June 1975) is a Dutch former cyclist. He was born in Montfoort and is the brother-in-law of British cyclist Chris Opie.

Major results

1997
 1st Overall Olympia's Tour
 1st Prologue 3-Länder-Tour
 2nd Time trial, National Under-23 Road Championships
 3rd Ronde van Overijssel
1998
 1st Ronde van Drenthe
2001
 2nd Time trial, National Road Championships
 3rd Overall Circuit Franco-Belge
 3rd Duo Normand (with Bart Voskamp)
 5th Scheldeprijs
2002
 6th Ronde van Drenthe
2003
 3rd Nationale Sluitingsprijs
2004
 4th Grote Prijs Jef Scherens

References

1975 births
Living people
Dutch male cyclists
People from Montfoort
Cyclists from Utrecht (province)